During the 1997–98 English football season, Barnsley competed in the Premier League.

Season summary
1997–98 was the first top-flight season in Barnsley's 102-year history, and, despite some courageous performances, their stay among the elite lasted just one season. They suffered from horrendous defeats and the leakiest defensive record in the division, conceding 82 goals. Their start to the season was OK, losing two and winning two of their first four games at Crystal Palace and against Bolton Wanderers. However, they were in the bottom three virtually for the remainder of the season after the 1–4 defeat at Wimbledon, though they did enjoy some success in the FA Cup, knocking out Manchester United in the fifth round before bowing out to eventual runners-up Newcastle United in the quarter-final. Their relegation was confirmed a few weeks later, and manager Danny Wilson then moved to South Yorkshire rivals Sheffield Wednesday. 35-year-old striker John Hendrie was appointed player-manager following Wilson's departure.

Final league table

Results summary

Results by round

Results
Barnsley's score comes first

Legend

FA Premier League

FA Cup

League Cup

Players

First-team squad
Squad at end of season

Left club during season

Reserve squad

Transfers

In

Out

Transfers in:  £5,750,000
Transfers out:  £150,000
Total spending:  £5,600,000

Statistics

Appearances and goals

|-
! colspan=14 style=background:#dcdcdc; text-align:center| Goalkeepers

|-
! colspan=14 style=background:#dcdcdc; text-align:center| Defenders

|-
! colspan=14 style=background:#dcdcdc; text-align:center| Midfielders

|-
! colspan=14 style=background:#dcdcdc; text-align:center| Forwards

|-
! colspan=14 style=background:#dcdcdc; text-align:center| Players transferred out during the season

References

Barnsley F.C. seasons
Barnsley